KZEN (100.3 FM) is a radio station broadcasting a country music format. Licensed to Central City, Nebraska, United States, the station serves the Columbus and Grand Island areas.  The station is currently owned by Alpha Media, through licensee Digity 3E License, LLC, and features programming from ABC Radio.

The station was founded in 1985.

References

External links

ZEN
Country radio stations in the United States